The 1919 Richmond Spiders football team was an American football team that represented the Richmond College—now known as the University of Richmond—as a member of the South Atlantic Intercollegiate Athletic Association (SAIAA) during the 1919 college football season. Frank Dobson returned for his sixth year as a head coach, having helmed the team from 1913 to 1917. Richmond compiled an overall record of 5–2–2 with a mark of 2–2–1 in SAIAA play.

Schedule

References

Richmond
Richmond Spiders football seasons
Richmond Spiders football